AVX may refer to:

Technology
 Advanced Vector Extensions, an instruction set extension in the x86 microprocessor architecture
 AVX2, an expansion of the AVX instruction set
 AVX-512, 512-bit extensions to the 256-bit AVX
 AVX Corporation, a manufacturer of electronic parts and a division of Kyocera

Other uses
 Avengers vs. X-Men, a comic book event
 Catalina Airport (FAA LID code), California, US